The 2005–06 season will be Ferencvárosi TC's104th competitive season, 104th consecutive season in the Borsodi Liga and 106th year in existence as a football club. Ferencváros banned from 2005-06 Hungarian Cup following incidents in 2004/05 final.

Squad

Transfers

Summer

In:

Out:

Source:

Winter

In:

ű

Out:

Source:

Competitions

Overview

Nemzeti Bajnokság I

League table

Results summary

Results by round

Matches

Hungarian Cup

UEFA Cup

Appearances and goals
Last updated on 3 June 2006.

|-
|colspan="14"|Youth players:

|-
|colspan="14"|Out to loan:

|-
|colspan="14"|Players no longer at the club:

|}

Top scorers
Includes all competitive matches. The list is sorted by shirt number when total goals are equal.
Last updated on 3 June 2006

Disciplinary record
Includes all competitive matches. Players with 1 card or more included only.

Last updated on 3 June 2006

Clean sheets
Last updated on 3 June 2006

References

External links
 Official Website
 UEFA
 fixtures and results

2005-06
Hungarian football clubs 2005–06 season